Executive Order 8484, issued on July 10, 1940, by U.S. President Franklin D. Roosevelt, was one of a series of amendments to Executive Order 8389.

Order 8389, issued on April 10, 1940, had frozen Norwegian and Danish financial assets held in the U.S., following their occupation by Nazi Germany during World War II. Order 8484 extended the same protection to the assets of Estonia, Latvia, and Lithuania after their occupation and annexation by the Soviet Union.

Text of Order

Response
The Soviet government condemned the freezing of the Baltic states' assets, asserting that there was no legal basis for suspending the transfer. Sumner Welles, acting Secretary of State, addressed the objection in a statement:

In conjunction with the Welles declaration, Executive Order 8484 and its enforcement by the Treasury Department offered both immediate and long-term benefits to the Baltic states.

References

8484
Soviet Union–United States relations
1940 in the United States
1940 in international relations